A Death in the Family is a 1957 novel by James Agee.

A Death in the Family may also refer to:

Adaptations of James Agee's novel
 A Death in the Family, a 1983 opera by William Mayer
 A Death in the Family, a 2002 television movie starring Annabeth Gish

Television episodes
 "A Death in the Family" (Law & Order)
 "A Death in the Family", an episode of Always Greener
 "A Death in the Family", an episode of Castle
 "A Death in the Family", an episode of Dallas
 "Death in the Family", an episode of The Incredible Hulk
 "A Death in the Family", an episode of Night Gallery
 "A Death in the Family", an episode of Touched by an Angel

Other uses
 A Death in the Family (audio play), a 2010 audio drama based on the TV series Doctor Who
 "A Death in the Family" (comics), a 1980s Batman comic book story arc
 Batman: Death in the Family, a 2020 American animated interactive short film based on the story arc
 A Death in the Family, a 2009 novel by Karl Ove Knausgård in the My Struggle series
 "Bloody Kisses (A Death in the Family)", a 1993 song by Type O Negative from Bloody Kisses